Diplopleura is a genus of nemerteans belonging to the family Lineidae.

Species:

Diplopleura curacaoensis 
Diplopleura formosa 
Diplopleura japonica 
Diplopleura obockiana 
Diplopleura vivesi

References

Lineidae
Nemertea genera